Daryl Ronald Gardener (born February 25, 1973) is a former American football defensive tackle in the National Football League (NFL) for the Miami Dolphins, Washington Redskins, and Denver Broncos.  He played college football at Baylor University and was drafted in the first round (20th overall) of the 1996 NFL Draft by the Miami Dolphins in a spot Ray Lewis thought was sure to be his.

On June 28, 2011, Gardener was arrested and charged with domestic-violence battery after he allegedly head butted his girlfriend during an argument.

References

1973 births
Living people
Miami Dolphins players
Washington Redskins players
American football defensive tackles
Denver Broncos players
Baylor Bears football players
Ed Block Courage Award recipients